The 1951 Chicago Cardinals season was the 32nd season the team was in the league. The team failed to improve on their previous output of 5–7, winning only three games. They failed to qualify for the playoffs for the third consecutive season.

Schedule

Standings

References 

1951
Chicago Cardinals
Chicago Card